Leaving Songs is an album by Stuart A. Staples, released on the Beggars Banquet label in 2006. The album features duets with Lhasa de Sela and Maria McKee, as well as a contribution from Terry Edwards.

Track listing
"Goodbye to Old Friends" – 6:13
"There Is a Path" – 3:53
"Which Way the Wind" – 3:11
"This Road is Long" – 3:44 (duet with Maria McKee)
"One More Time" – 3:16
"Dance With an Old Man" – 2:09
"That Leaving Feeling" – 4:02 (duet with Lhasa)
"Already Gone" – 3:32
"This Old Town" – 4:00
"Pulling In to the Sea" – 2:57

All songs written by Stuart A. Staples.

References 

2006 albums
Stuart A. Staples albums
Beggars Banquet Records albums